William McDowell (1837 – 12 June 1918) was a Scottish cricketer. He played in two first-class matches in New Zealand for Canterbury in 1883/84.

See also
 List of Canterbury representative cricketers

References

External links
 

1837 births
1918 deaths
Scottish cricketers
Canterbury cricketers
Cricketers from Christchurch